Arantxa Sánchez Vicario and Natasha Zvereva were the defending champions, but competed this year with different partners.

Sánchez Vicario teamed up with Larisa Neiland and lost in semifinals to Katrina Adams and Manon Bollegraf.

Zvereva teamed up with Gigi Fernández and successfully defended her title, by defeating Adams and Bollegraf 6–3, 6–1 in the final.

Seeds
The first four seeds received a bye into the second round.

Draw

Finals

Top half

Bottom half

References

External links
 Official results archive (ITF)
 Official results archive (WTA)

Family Circle Cup
Charleston Open